Augustine Cuero Rubit (born August 14, 1989) is an American professional basketball player for Bayern Munich of the Basketball Bundesliga (BBL) and the EuroLeague. He is a 2.03 m (6'8") tall power forward-center. He played college basketball at the University of South Alabama.  Rubit was an All-American player at South Alabama, and was one of the nation's best rebounders.

High school
Rubit, a native of Houston, Texas, played high school basketball at Christian Life High School.  He then chose University of South Alabama for college, where he red-shirted the 2009–10 season.

College career
As a red-shirt freshman in 2010–11, Rubit started the majority of the season.  He averaged 13.1 points and 11.0 rebounds per game.  His rebounding total was good for first in the Sun Belt Conference and sixth nationally.  At the close of the season, Rubit was named third team All-conference and the leagues' freshman of the year.

In his second season, Rubit became one of the Jaguars' primary scoring options, leading the team at 15.2 per game.  He also continued his strong rebounding (9.2 per game - best in the Sun Belt) and shot blocking (.9 per game), earning first team All-Sun Belt and NABC All-District honors.  In his junior year, Rubit became the conference's top player, averaging 19.4 points and 10.2 rebounds per game and leading the Jaguars to the 2013 CollegeInsider.com Postseason Tournament.  At the close of the season, Rubit was named Conference Player of the Year and an AP honorable mention All-American.

Professional career
On June 30, 2017, Rubit signed with the German League club Brose Bamberg. On July 8, 2019, Rubit signed a two-year contract with the Greek EuroLeague club Olympiacos.

On July 13, 2020, he has signed with Žalgiris Kaunas of the Lithuanian Basketball League (LKL). Rubit averaged 8.1 points and 4.2 rebounds per game. He parted ways with the team on July 26, 2021. On August 24, Rubit signed with Bayern Munich of the Basketball Bundesliga and the EuroLeague.

References

External links
Euroleague.net profile
Eurobasket.com profile
South Alabama Jaguars bio

1989 births
Living people
American expatriate basketball people in Germany
American expatriate basketball people in Greece
American expatriate basketball people in Lithuania
American men's basketball players
Basketball players from Houston
Brose Bamberg players
Centers (basketball)
FC Bayern Munich basketball players
Olympiacos B.C. players
Power forwards (basketball)
Ratiopharm Ulm players
South Alabama Jaguars men's basketball players
Tigers Tübingen players